Best of the Best is a 1989 American martial arts film directed by Bob Radler, and produced by Phillip Rhee, who also co-wrote the story and co-stars in the film. The film starred Eric Roberts, James Earl Jones, Sally Kirkland, Simon Rhee and Chris Penn.

The plot revolves around a team of American martial artists facing a team of South Korean martial artists in a martial arts tournament. Several subplots pop up in the story — moral conflicts, the power of the human spirit triumphing over adversity and the meaning of life are some themes.

Set and filmed in Los Angeles, California, and Seoul, South Korea, between February 13 and April 6, 1989, Best of the Best was released on November 10, 1989.

The film has spawned three sequels: Best of the Best 2 (1993), Best of the Best 3: No Turning Back (1995), and Best of the Best 4: Without Warning (1998). Phillip Rhee portrays Tommy Lee in all four films, produced all of them, directed the third and fourth films, and co-wrote the first and fourth films.

Plot
Alexander Grady, a widower and father from Portland, Oregon is chosen to represent the United States of America in an international martial arts tournament against Team Korea. Once a rising star in the martial arts world, he suffered a shoulder injury that forced him into retirement. Also chosen for the team are Tommy Lee, a highly skilled martial arts instructor from Fresno, California; Travis Brickley, an extremely brash fighter with a short fuse from Miami, Florida; Virgil Keller, a devout Buddhist from Providence, Rhode Island; and Sonny Grasso, a streetwise fighter from Detroit, Michigan. Despite being coached by veteran trainer Frank Couzo, their chances of winning are virtually non-existent, as the Koreans train all year long, enjoy full financial support from their nation, and have—on at least one occasion—killed a competitor in the ring. To win, they will need to be the best technically, physically, and mentally.

As training begins, the team struggles to bond as Travis antagonizes them. Given the pressure, the American team hires a second assistant coach, Catherine Wade, whose spiritual approach to training clashes with Couzo's more rigorous coaching techniques. Tommy is disturbed when his opponent is revealed to be Dae Han Park, Team Korea's best fighter and veteran martial artist who was responsible for killing Tommy's brother David Lee in a similar tournament. Couzo hopes that Tommy's desire for revenge will give him the necessary aggression to win, while Wade is more concerned about Tommy's mental state. With time and training, the team begins to bond and to earn each other's respect.

Couzo cuts Alex from the team when he breaks the rigid training regimen to visit his son, who had been hit by a car; later, Tommy quits after knocking out Virgil with a powerful spinning side kick during practice. Conflicted by his desire for revenge, Tommy confesses to Alex his fear of fighting Dae Han, but Alex strongly urges him to do the right thing and face his brother's killer. Travis and the others persuade Couzo to reinstate Alex, and Tommy eventually rejoins the team after a change of heart.

In the first two matches of the tournament, Sonny and Virgil are out-classed by their Korean opponents Yung Kim and Han Cho. Travis does his best to psyche up the team with his brash attitude, going point for point with his Korean counterpart Tung Sung Moon, but gets beaten in a tie-breaker brick-breaking competition. Alex dominates his match with his opponent, Sae Jin Kwon, but takes a devastating axe-kick to his shoulder which dislocates it. Instead of giving up, he implores Tommy to "pop" the shoulder back into place and resumes the fight, ultimately defeating his opponent with one arm and winning the match. Finally, Tommy faces Dae Han. After a slow start, Tommy gets the upper hand and delivers a series of blows that forces Dae Han solely on the defensive. As the match nears its end, Tommy has brought the American team within two points of outright victory, and Dae Han can barely stand. Tommy prepares to finish the fight, but knowing that Dae Han would not survive the attack, his coaches and teammates dissuade him. Tommy hesitates and lets the clock run out, saving the man's life but forfeiting the overall victory. Couzo consoles Tommy afterwards, telling him, "You won that match. Don't ever forget that".

At the medal ceremony, Dae Han unexpectedly approaches Tommy and praises him for his honorable act. He tearfully apologizes for the death of Tommy's brother, and in return offers himself as a brother. Tommy accepts, and Dae Han places his medal around Tommy's neck before the two men embrace. Sae Jin Kwon then walks up to Alex and states his long-time admiration for him as a fighter, before also handing over his medal. The other members of Team Korea then follow suit, awarding their medals to their respective American opponents.

Cast
 Eric Roberts as Alex Grady
 James Earl Jones as Coach Frank Couzo
 Phillip Rhee as Tommy Lee
 Chris Penn as Travis Brickley
 John Dye as Virgil Keller
 David Agresta as Sonny Grasso
 Tom Everett as Assistant Coach Don Peterson
 Sally Kirkland as Catherine Wade
 John P. Ryan as Jennings
 Louise Fletcher as Mrs. Grady, Alex's Mother
 Edan Gross as Walter Grady, Alex's Son
 Hee Il Cho as Korean Coach
 Simon Rhee as Dae Han Park
 James Lew as Sae Jin Kwon
 Ken Nagayama as Yung Kim
 Ahmad Rashad as Broadcaster
 Kane Hodder as Burt
 Edward Bunker as Stan
 Ho Sik Pak as Han Cho
 Dae Kyu Chang as Tung Sung Moon
 Emilie Hagen as Baby Walter, Alex's Son
 Melanie Kinnaman as The Woman

Soundtrack

Originally released as a vinyl record album, cassette and CD, re-released on CD in 2004.

Tales of Power - Jim Capaldi (3:32)
Best of the Best- Stubblefield & Hall (4:12)
American Hotel - Kirsten Nash (4:14)
Something so Strong - Jim Capaldi (4:34)
The Devil Made Me Do It - Golden Earring (3:18)
Radar Love (live) - Golden Earring (4:00)
Backroads - Charlie Major (4:03)
Original Score Medley - Paul Gilman (4:11)
Someday I'm Gonna Ride in a Cadillac - Charlie Major (3:36)

Reception
Professional critics were universally negative about the film, although it inspired several sequels and has gained a following over the years. On Metacritic the film has a weighted average score of 26 out of 100, based on 7 critics, indicating "generally unfavorable reviews". In his book Iceman: My Fighting Life, UFC champion Chuck Liddell cites Best of the Best as his personal favorite martial arts film. Movie historian Leonard Maltin, on the other hand, dismissed the picture as "Yet another Rocky clone" and "An appalling waste of talent...a top-drawer cast in search of a script."

Reboot
Rhee revealed in an interview with The Action Elite that he's planning on rebooting the franchise with a new cast and Rhee will produce the new film.

References

External links

1989 films
1989 martial arts films
1989 action films
American action films
American martial arts films
Films about Korean Americans
1980s English-language films
Films set in Los Angeles
Films set in Seoul
Films set in South Korea
Kung fu films
Martial arts tournament films
Taekwondo films
Best of the Best (film series)
1989 directorial debut films
Films directed by Robert Radler
1980s American films